David Thomas Tayloe, Jr. (September 12, 1894 – September 14, 1934) was an American college football player and physician.

College football
Tayloe was twice captain of North Carolina Tar Heels football teams. He tied for the longest run of the 1915 college football season with a 90-yard sprint. In 1914 he made Outing magazine's "Football Roll of Honor." That team won all its games by large scores except for the last week when it was defeated by Virginia. The Atlanta Constitution called Tayloe "one of the most brilliant backs in the south today."

References

American football halfbacks
1894 births
1934 deaths
North Carolina Tar Heels football players
Players of American football from North Carolina
People from Washington, North Carolina
Physicians from North Carolina